Pomalinsky is a rural locality (a khutor) in Stezhenskoye Rural Settlement, Alexeyevsky District, Volgograd Oblast, Russia. The population was 196 as of 2010.

Geography 
Pomalinsky is located 5 km northwest of Alexeyevskaya (the district's administrative centre) by road. Stezhensky is the nearest rural locality.

References 

Rural localities in Alexeyevsky District, Volgograd Oblast